Boris Birshtein, born 11 November 1947 in Lithuania, is a businessman and the former chairman of Seabeco, an investment and trading company.

Birshtein reportedly made his fortune exploiting high-level contacts in Russia following the fall of the Soviet Union in December 1991. He is said to have emigrated to Canada in 1979. He was resident in Canada until 1992, when he left for Zurich, Switzerland.

Business career

Personal Investments 
In October 2019, it was reported that Birshtein has made an investment into GEMGOW, an online platform for trading precious stones.

Seabeco Group 
Birshtein is the former chairman of Seabeco Group. The origins of Seabeco Group are uncertain. In October 1993 the Toronto Star cited Russian sources saying that Seabeco was established by the Soviet Union in the late 1980s to help smuggle state money to the west. Later reports claimed that Seabeco invested in property in Russia in the late 1980s and early 1990s, including the 30-story Trump Tower luxury hotel, a theatre complex and gymnasium. It also entered into a joint partnership with Daewoo, a South Korean conglomerate, in 1987.

In the 1980s and 1990s, Birshtein was close many prominent persons including several prominent Soviet and later Russian leaders in politics and the KGB such as KGB Colonel Leonid Veselovsky, Georgy Arbatov, Viktor Barannikov, Alexander Smolensky (Baba Shura) of SBS-AGRO JSCB and "O.V.K." ("Mutual Credit Society" or ) which were part of the "Vienna Black Exchange", Marc Rich, Leonid Kuchma, Igor Makarov and Itera. In 1991, Veselovsky was responsible for pro Kremlin commercial operations overseas in support of the Communist Party. Arbatov is a founder and director of the Institute of USA and Canada of the Russian Academy of Sciences (ISKRAN) in Moscow which was an arm of the Kremlin's intelligence and foreign policy efforts against Canada and the United States to support the Central Committee of the Soviet Union and later Russia, the Ministry of Foreign Affairs of the Soviet Union and later Russia, and the KGB.  

Seabeco opened an office in Canada following Birshtein's emigration to the country. Russian offshoots of Seabeco reportedly included a joint venture with the former head of the Moscow Police force, a joint venture with labour unions, a trading company and a private bank. Seabeco began to wind down its Canadian operations in 1992. According to Steve Shnaider, a vice president of Seabeco, this was to move Seabeco workers "closer to Russia."

Seabeco in Zurich was reportedly wound up in 1993 after accusations in Russia that it was involved in fraud and money-laundering. Former KGB Colonel Leonid Veselovsky was working at this office from early August 1991 until 1993 when it was revealed that Veselovsky had been KGB and he left his job amid the scandal.

Connection to Moldova 
In 1991 Birshtein was appointed by Mircea Snegur, the former president of Moldova, to lead the country's Committee for Reconstruction and Development. He was also employed to serve as Moldova foreign trade representative.

Reports have said Seabeco was released from tax obligations in the country as a result of Birshtein's position. The company returned the favour by setting up Moldova first international business school.

Birshtein introduced members of the Moldova government to high level ministers in Canada, including Charles McMillan, the former advisor to Canadian Prime Minister Brian Mulroney. McMillan helped the country devise a market reform programme in the early 1990s. Canadian MP and former trade minister Monte Kwinter once said of Birshtein relationship with the former Kyrgyzstan president, Askar Akaev; “You talk about being at the foot of the president, well, those two were inseparable.”

Corruption allegations 
In 1993 Birshtein became the subject of unproven allegations that he had used Seabeco to loot millions of dollars from the former Soviet state treasury. The investigation was launched at the behest of Boris Yeltsin.

The Toronto Star revealed evidence provided against Birshtein was given by Dmitri Yakoubovski, a former Russian government official and a former executive with Seabeco. An aide to Moscow's chief prosecutor said at the time that “Politicians [were] using corruption as a weapon against their rivals.”

In April 2005 Birshtein's company Seabeco was named by Kyrgyz courts in relation to the suspected embezzlement of 23 million dollars worth of gold in Switzerland. The investigation was launched in April 2005, after the popular overthrow of Kyrgyzstan leader Akayev the previous month.

Following his deposition, Kyrgyz Justice sent Swiss prosecutors a list of members of the presidential entourage that it suspected of being involved in the malpractices.

The request related to a 1991 order Akayev made to transport the gold to Zurich, into a bank account controlled by a subsidiary of Seabeco. Swiss authorities refused to act at the time, saying the request for cooperation was not detailed enough.

References

1947 births
People from Lithuania Governorate
Living people
Lithuanian business executives
Russian businesspeople in Canada